And Give My Love to the Swallows is a 1972 Czech biographical film based on the prison diary from Czech resistance fighter Marie Kudeříková.

Cast 
 Magdaléna Vášáryová - Maruška Kudeříková
 Viera Strnisková - Mother
 Július Vašek - Father
  - Julek
 Dagmar Bláhová - Julinka 
 Hana Pastejríková - Jarka
 Hana Maciuchová - Vítezka

References

External links 

1970s biographical films
Czech biographical films
1970s Czech films